HMS Tara was an  destroyer, which served with the Royal Navy. Launched on 7 August 1918, the vessel entered service at the closing of the First World War. The ship joined the Fourteenth Destroyer Flotilla of the Grand Fleet but was placed in Reserve at Nore in 1919. Tara deteriorated over the following years and was sold to be broken up on 17 December 1931 after the signing of the London Naval Treaty that limited the amount of destroyer tonnage the Navy could retain.

Design and development

Tara was one of thirty-three Admiralty  destroyers ordered by the British Admiralty in June 1917 as part of the Twelfth War Construction Programme. Differences with the R class were minor, such as having the searchlight moved aft.

Two funnels were fitted.

Armament consisted of three QF  Mk IV guns on the ship's centreline. One was mounted raised on the forecastle, one between the funnels on a raised platform and one aft. The ship also mounted a single  2-pounder pom-pom anti-aircraft gun for air defence. Four  torpedo tubes were fitted in two twin rotating mounts aft. The ship also carried two  torpedo tubes on single rotating mounts mounted under the bridge, one to port and the other starboard. They were intended to be used during night attacks and controlled directly by the commanding officer using toggle ropes. The ship had a complement of 90 officers and ratings.

Construction and career
Laid down on 21 November 1917 by William Beardmore and Company in Dalmuir with the yard number 590, Tara was launched on 12 October 1918 and completed on 9 December 1918. The vessel was the first and only of the name.

With the First World War closing, the destroyer saw no action before the Armistice. At the end of the war, the ship remained with the Grand Fleet until it was dissolved. As the navy no longer required such a large active fleet of ships, Tara was transferred to join sixty-three other destroyers in reserve at Nore. On 22 April 1930, the United Kingdom signed the London Naval Treaty, which limited total destroyer tonnage in the Navy. Having remained on reserve for more than a decade, Tara was found to be in poor condition and was one of those chosen to be retired. In July 1931, Tara was replaced as tender to the Torpedo School by sister ship , with Taras crew transferring to Stronghold. On 17 December 1931, the destroyer was sold to Rees of Llanelly, and broken up.

Pennant number

References

Citations

Bibliography

 
 
 
 
 
 
 
 

1918 ships
S-class destroyers (1917) of the Royal Navy
Ships built on the River Clyde